Valaika is a surname. Notable people with the surname include:

 Chris Valaika (born 1985), American baseball infielder
 Pat Valaika (born 1992), American baseball infielder